The New Conservatory Theatre Center is a not-for-profit theatre company located in San Francisco, California. NCTC showcases an eight-show Pride Season, an In-Concert/Cabaret Series, Family Theatre performances, YouthAware Touring Educational Theatre, and an Emerging Artists program.  NCTC also houses a comprehensive Conservatory for youth and adults.  It is located in San Francisco at 25 Van Ness Avenue, near  Market Street.

Organizational history 
Founded in 1981 as a small theatre arts conservatory for low-income youth by Ed Decker (a former director of the American Conservatory Theater’s Young Conservatory), NCTC has been in operation for 31 years. In 1986, as a response to the AIDS epidemic sweeping the nation and heavily concentrated in San Francisco, Decker created the landmark YouthAware Touring Educational Theatre program which has since expanded to address an array of health and wellness concerns, been translated into five languages, and achieved national and international recognition.  To date, more than 4.5 million youth in the U.S., Germany, Australia, South Africa, Holland, and the U.K. have seen YouthAware Theatre-in-Education programs in their schools and communities.  In 2004, Decker received the STOP AIDS Award for his work.   

In 1995, Decker premiered the first Pride Season, a series of LGBT-themed performances that has since caught the eye of many renowned LGBT and Allied playwrights and directors.  Decker has developed and/or premiered plays for NCTC’s main stage with artists such as Norman Allen, Terrence McNally, Edmund White, Joe Mantello, Mark Cannistraro, Mart Crowley, Jack Heifner, Hal Corley, Felice Picano, Brad Fraser, David Marshall Grant, Jeff Baron, Kevin Elyot, Jonathan Harvey, Jewelle Gomez, and Lee Blessing.

Summary of programs 
NCTC's current activities fall under three main categories: Theatre productions and new play development, Conservatory training, and the YouthAware Educational Theatre Program. 

Theatre Productions
NCTC's theatre performance program is anchored around their mainstage season, an eleven-month season featuring an average of eight plays and musicals. Plays are selected based on their examination of LGBT issues as they relate to our current world. NCTC also houses a Family Matinee program, featuring performances designed for children 4-10 and their families. 

New Play Development Lab and Emerging Artists Program
In 2002, NCTC's New Play Development Lab was created to commission and develop new work to expand the canon of LGBT-themed plays, give voice to new and diverse playwrights, and add to the list of over 40 world premieres NCTC has produced since 1981. NCTC commissions, develops, and premiers approximately one new play each season, in addition one new play for young audiences ever 36 months to tour as part of the YouthAware Educational Theatre Program. Since the inception of the New Plays Development Lab in 2002, NCTC has commissioned several new plays, including Crucifixion by four-time Tony Award-winning playwright Terrence McNally.  NCTC Emerging Artists Program is a commissioning residency to develop and produce new work by emerging actors, singers, and writers, and to nurture the next generation of playwrights expanding the canon of queer and allied works. 

Conservatory Program The New Conservatory Theatre Center provides year-round theatre training classes to young people across San Francisco County.

In-House Conservatory for Youth NCTC offers classes for students of all ages in acting, singing, musical theatre, and playwrighting at their downtown San Francisco location, serving about 200 youth annually.

Satellite Drama Program NCTC sends fifteen highly qualified drama instructors into San Francisco County Public Schools, offering a wide range of after-school theatre arts classes in locations convenient to participants and their families. All conservatory programs at NCTC meet the California Standards for Arts Education.

Vocational Training Program paid internships and positions are offered to interested students ages 13–19. Students are employed as teaching assistants, assistant stage managers, assistant directors, and technical theatre assistants. This program serves 7-12 students annually.

Adult Classes NCTC has offered Conservatory classes for adults in scene study, improvisation, singing, and playwriting.

YouthAware Educational Theatre YouthAware is an eight-show repertoire of plays, educational materials, workshops, and structured discussions facilitated both in house and toured throughout Northern California school districts, community centers, shelters and juvenile justice facilities. YouthAware programs reach over 20,000 youth per year, using performing arts as a vehicle for examining such issues as HIV Awareness and Prevention, Drug and Alcohol Abuse, Homophobia, Violence, Hate Crimes, Body Image, and Diversity.

References

External links 
 New Conservatory Theatre Center website

Theatres in California
Theatre companies in San Francisco
Performing groups established in 1981
1981 establishments in California